Delta Pavonis, Latinized from δ Pavonis, is a single star in the southern constellation of Pavo. It has an apparent visual magnitude of 3.56, making it a fourth-magnitude star that is visible to the naked eye from the southern hemisphere. This makes it one of the nearest bright stars to the Solar System.

Observations
This object is a subgiant of spectral type G8 IV; it will stop fusing hydrogen at its core relatively soon, starting the process of becoming a red giant. Hence, Delta Pavonis is 24% brighter than the Sun, but the effective temperature of its outer atmosphere is less: 5,571 K. Its mass is 105% of Sol's mass, with a mean radius 120% of Sol's radius. Delta Pavonis's surface convection zone extends downward to about 43.1% of the star's radius, but only contains 4.8% of the star's mass.

Spectroscopic examination of Delta Pavonis shows that it has a higher abundance of elements heavier than helium (metallicity) than does the Sun. This value is typically given in terms of the ratio of iron (chemical symbol Fe) to hydrogen (H) in a star's atmosphere, relative to that in Sol's atmosphere (iron being a good proxy for the presence of other heavy elements). The metallicity of Delta Pavonis is approximately

This notation gives the logarithm of the iron-to-hydrogen ratio, relative to that of the Sun, meaning that Delta Pavonis's iron abundance is 214% of that of Sol. It is considered super metal-rich, and the high metallicity has slowed its evolution. Studies have shown a correlation between abundant heavy elements in stars, and the presence of a planetary system, so Delta Pavonis has a greater than average probability of harboring planets.

The age of Delta Pavonis is approximately 6.6 to 6.9 billion years, and is certainly in the  billion year range. It appears to be rotating slowly, with a projected rotational velocity of 0.32 kilometers per second.

Search for planets
The existence of a Jupiter-mass gas giant on a long-period orbit around Delta Pavonis is suspected, as of 2021, based on astrometric data. A study in 2023 detected a trend in the star's radial velocity, which may indicate the presence of a planetary companion, supporting the previous astrometric result.

SETI
Delta Pavonis has been identified by Maggie Turnbull and Jill Tarter of the SETI Institute as the "Best SETI target" among the  100 closest G-type stars. Properties in its favor include a high metallicity, minimal level of magnetic activity, low rotation rate, and kinematic membership in the thin disk population of the Milky Way. Gas giants orbiting in, near, or through a star's habitable zone may destabilize the orbits of terrestrial planets in that zone; the lack of detected radial velocity variation suggests that there are no such gas giants orbiting Delta Pavonis. However, observation has detected no artificial radio sources. Delta Pavonis, a close photometric match to the Sun, is the nearest solar analog that is not a member of a binary or multiple star system.

References

Further reading

External links
 

G-type subgiants
Pavonis, Delta
Suspected variables
Hypothetical planetary systems

Pavo (constellation)
J20084376-6610563
Pavonis, Delta
7665
CD-66 2367
0780
190248
099240